Daniel Liam Parsons (born June 27, 1977) is a Canadian rower. He was born in Thunder Bay, Ontario.

Parsons won a bronze in the men's lightweight fours at the 2008 Summer Olympics with Iain Brambell, Mike Lewis and Jon Beare.

References

External links
 Profile at Rowing Canada

1977 births
Living people
Rowers from Ontario
Canadian male rowers
Olympic rowers of Canada
Olympic bronze medalists for Canada
Rowers at the 2008 Summer Olympics
Sportspeople from Thunder Bay
University of Western Ontario alumni
Olympic medalists in rowing
Medalists at the 2008 Summer Olympics